The second World Greco-Roman Wrestling Championship was organized in Berlin, Germany in April 1905.

Medal table

Medal summary

Men's Greco-Roman

References
UWW Database

World Wrestling Championships
W
W
1905 in sport wrestling